Alyona Sotnikova and Lenka Wienerová were the defending champions, but Wienerová chose not to participate.
Sotnikova partnered up with Marie-Ève Pelletier, but lost in the final to Maria Fernanda Alves and Jessica Moore, 6–7(6–8), 6–3, [10–8].

Seeds

Draw

Draw

References
 Main Draw

Audi Melbourne Pro Tennis Classic - Doubles